Iván Pérez Rossi is a singer and musician born in Ciudad Bolívar, Venezuela, August 3, 1943. He was a part of the musical group Serenata Guayanesa.

See also 
Venezuela
Music of Venezuela
Serenata Guayanesa

External links
Iván Pérez Rossi Discography

1943 births
Living people
Central University of Venezuela alumni
People from Ciudad Bolívar
Venezuelan composers
Male composers
Venezuelan folk singers